Tierra del fuego is a 2000 Chilean drama film directed by Miguel Littín. Based on a short story of the same name by Francisco Coloane, it is about the conquest of Tierra del Fuego by Julius Popper. It was screened in the Un Certain Regard section at the 2000 Cannes Film Festival.

Plot 
The film is set in the late 19th century, when Julius Popper (1857-1893) claims the Isla Grande of Tierra del Fuego on behalf of Queen Elisabeth of Wied of Romania (also known as Carmen Sylva; 1843-1916). Popper's goal is to search for gold, which he pursues under the motto "civilization or death." He is accompanied by a diverse group of characters from various nationalities, including Armenia, a beautiful prostitute; Spiro, an Italian adventurer; Shaeffer, a loyal German follower of Popper; Novak, an Austrian who serves as the group's general; and Silveira, a Galician bagpipe interpreter. The film also highlights the unknown and rugged nature of the island.

Cast
 Jorge Perugorría as Julius Popper
 Ornella Muti as Armenia
 Tamara Acosta as Mennar
 Nelson Villagra as Novak
 Álvaro Rudolphy as Schaeffer
 Nancho Novo as Silveira
 Luis Alarcón as Alexis
 Claudio Santamaria as Spiro
 Uxía Blanco as Mother Silveira
 Omero Antonutti
 Héctor Delgado

References

External links

2000 films
2000 drama films
2000s Spanish-language films
Films directed by Miguel Littín
Chilean drama films
Films with screenplays by Tonino Guerra
Tierra del Fuego Province, Argentina
Films set on islands
Films set in Argentina